Bereta may refer to:

 Joe Bereta of Barats and Bereta, American sketch comedy group
 Georges Bereta, French football player

See also
 Baretta (disambiguation)
 Barretter (disambiguation)
 Beretta (disambiguation)
 Biretta